The MacCarthy dynasty of Muskerry is a tacksman branch of the MacCarthy Mor dynasty, the Kings of Desmond.

Origins and advancement 

The MacCarthy of Muskerry are a cadet branch of the MacCarthy Mor, Kings of Desmond. This cadet branch was founded by Dermot MacCarthy, 1st Lord of Muskerry, second son of Cormac MacCarthy Mor, King of Desmond, who was in 1353 created Lord of Muskerry by the English. This title's position is unclear. Cormac Laidir MacCarthy, 9th Lord of Muskerry was called Dominus and F. Dermot's descendant Cormac Oge MacCarthy, 17th Lord of Muskerry, was in 1628 created Charles MacCarthy, 1st Viscount Muskerry, and his son, the 2nd Viscount Muskerry, was in 1658 created Donough MacCarty, 1st Earl of Clancarty.

Lands 
The family's ancestral lands of were situated along the River Lee in the baronies of Muskerry West and Muskerry East, in central County Cork west of the City of Cork.

Castles 
 Blarney Castle, enlarged by Cormac Laidir MacCarthy, 9th Lord of Muskerry
 Carrigaphooca Castle, built by Dermot McCarthy of Drishane Castle.
 Castle Salem, Cork
 Kilcrea Castle, built by Cormac Laidir MacCarthy, 9th Lord of Muskerry
 Macroom Castle
 Carrigadrohid castle.
 Carrignamuck Tower House

Monasteries 
Kilcrea Friary, built by Cormac Laidir MacCarthy, 9th Lord of Muskerry

Blarney Stone 
The Blarney Stone passed from MacCarthy hands during the Williamite wars. Following the forfeiture by Donogh McCarthy, 4th Earl of Clancarthy, the castle property passed to the Hollow Sword Blade Company who subsequently sold it to Sir James St. John Jefferyes, Governor of Cork in 1688.

DownFall 
Donough MacCarthy, 4th Earl of Clancarty fought in the Williamite War in Ireland for James II of England against William III of England. He was attainted at the defeat in 1691 and the MacCarthys of Muskerry lost the noble titles of Earl of Clancarty, Viscount Muskerry, and Baron Blarney.

The titles of Mountcashel and Baron Castleinch, of the (1689 creation, went extinct with the death of Justin MacCarthy in 1694. At that date the MacCarthys of Muskerry had therefore lost all their noble titles in the peerage of Ireland.

Legacy 
The dynasty is still in existence and can be considered to still broadly belong to the Irish nobility, but its leadership is in confusion. There also remains some dispute with their (friendly) rivals and kinsmen the MacCarthys Reagh, concerning the title Prince of Desmond. The main line of the MacCarthy Mor dynasty became extinct in the late 16th century and it has ever since been unclear who inherits the title, because of the advent of the career of Florence MacCarthy. See Kingdom of Desmond. There are also earlier MacCarthy Mor septs in existence who are claimants. The situation was recently thrown into even more exotic confusion by the impostor Terence Francis MacCarthy.(the dyanasty is not extinct most of the family moved to America and the family name was changed ever so slightly over the years to McCarthy, McCarty and then through marriage McClendan it became both an Irish and Scottish family.

Notes and references

Notes

Citations

Sources 

 
 
 
  – S to T
  – Canonteign to Cutts
 
 
 
 
  – Irish stem

MacCarthy dynasty